Katoomba House is a heritage-listed residence at 81 Kent Street, in the inner city Sydney suburb of Millers Point in the City of Sydney local government area of New South Wales, Australia. It is also known as Seaforth House. It was added to the New South Wales State Heritage Register on 2 April 1999.

History 
Millers Point is one of the earliest areas of European settlement in Australia, and a focus for maritime activities. This imposing three-storey Victorian Italianate house with verandahs to both upper floors was originally a two-storey house with additions . First tenanted by the NSW Department of Housing in 1985.

Description 
A large, three storey Victorian Italianate house in good condition. Very important rear wing is lined by Victorian balconies (the upper floor built post 1880). This residence has four bedrooms. Storeys: Three; Construction: Painted rendered masonry walls, slate roof to main body of house, corrugated galvanised iron to balcony verandah, and rear wing. Cast iron balcony lace. Style: Victorian.

The external condition of the property is good.

Modifications and dates 
External: 3rd floor . Last inspected: 19 February 1995.

Heritage listing 
As at 23 November 2000, this building is an imposing three storey Victorian Italianate house with verandahs to both upper floors.

It is part of the Millers Point Conservation Area, an intact residential and maritime precinct. It contains residential buildings and civic spaces dating from the 1830s and is an important example of 19th century adaptation of the landscape.

Katoomba House was listed on the New South Wales State Heritage Register on 2 April 1999.

See also 

Australian residential architectural styles

References

Bibliography

Attribution

External links

 

New South Wales State Heritage Register sites located in Millers Point
Houses in Millers Point, New South Wales
Italianate architecture in Sydney
Articles incorporating text from the New South Wales State Heritage Register
Millers Point Conservation Area